Auguste may refer to:

People

Surname 
 Arsène Auguste (born 1951), Haitian footballer
 Donna Auguste (born 1958), African-American businesswoman
 Georges Auguste (born 1933), Haitian painter 
 Henri Auguste (1759–1816), Parisian gold and silversmith
 Joyce Auguste, Saint Lucian musician
 Jules Robert Auguste (1789–1850), French painter
 Tancrède Auguste (1856–1913), President of Haiti (1912–13)

Given name 
 Auguste, Baron Lambermont (1819–1905), Belgian statesman
 Auguste, Duke of Leuchtenberg (1810–1835), prince consort of Maria II of Portugal
 Auguste, comte de La Ferronays (1777–1842), French Minister of Foreign Affairs
 Auguste Clot (1858–1936), French art printer
 Auguste Dick (1910–1993), Austrian historian of mathematics
 Georges Auguste Escoffier (1846–1935), French chef, restaurateur and culinary writer 
 Auguste Metz (1812–1854), Luxembourgian entrepreneur
 Auguste Léopold Protet (1808–1862), French Navy admiral
 Auguste Piccard (1884–1962), Swiss physicist, inventor, and explorer
 Auguste Rodin (1840–1917), French sculptor
 Auguste Schepp (1846-1905), German painter
 Auguste Tessier (1853–1938), Quebec lawyer and political figure
 Auguste Villiers de l'Isle-Adam (1838–1889), French symbolist writer
 Auguste von Müller (1849–1912), German operatic mezzo-soprano and actress
 Duchess Auguste of Württemberg (1734–1787), wife of Karl Anselm, Prince of Thurn and Taxis
 Catherine the Great birth name was Princess Sophie Friederike Auguste

Fiction 
 Auguste (film), a 1961 French comedy film directed by Pierre Chevalier
 Auguste, the deceased Crown Prince of Vere in the Captive Prince novels by C. S. Pacat
 Auguste, a knight in the fantasy manga series Majo no Shinzō
 Auguste Beau, the antagonist of the manga series Kaze to Ki no Uta
 Auguste de Montesse, the father of the protagonist of the manga series Claudine

Ships 
 Auguste (ship), which struck Cape Breton Island, Canada in 1761
 French ship Auguste, a ship of the French Navy, launched in 1778
 HMS Auguste (1705), a 54-gun French ship captured by the British in 1705

Other uses 
 Auguste (restaurant), a Michelin starred restaurant in Maarssen, Netherlands
 Auguste clown, a type of clown
 Auguste Island, an Antarctic island in Gerlache Strait

French masculine given names
German feminine given names
French-language surnames